Satan's Waitin is a 1954 Warner Bros. Looney Tunes cartoon directed by Friz Freleng. The short was released on August 7, 1954, and stars Tweety and Sylvester.

A later short, Devil's Feud Cake (1963), was re-titled Satan's Waitin  when it was featured as part of The Looney Looney Looney Bugs Bunny Movie. The plot of Devil's Feud Cake closely follows this one, but features Bugs Bunny and Yosemite Sam.

Plot 
Sylvester is in pursuit of Tweety, chasing him to the top of a building.  Sylvester falls from the building (first he grabs some of Tweety's tail feathers to help him fly, but Tweety is able to take them back), crashes to the sidewalk and dies. The spirit of his first life approaches two escalators and takes the "down" (to Hell) one (since the one going "up" (to Heaven) is roped off) and ends up in Hell.  He is greeted by a Satanic bulldog (Hector the Bulldog), who realizes he must goad Sylvester into giving up his remaining eight lives, so he asks life #1 to sit on a bench to wait for the others.

Sylvester wakes up and Tweety tells him he is in trouble for breaking the sidewalk (which cracked upon impact of his earlier fall). Sylvester has had enough of Tweety and tells him to get lost. The bulldog's spirit reminds him that he has eight lives left, so Sylvester starts the chase up again. He chases Tweety around a moving steamroller but gets flattened, sending life #2 through the street and into Hell. The flat #2 gets up and sits beside #1.

The chase then continues through an amusement park. They both run into a lion's mouth entranceway to the fun house, but Sylvester steps back out, takes one look at the lion and is literally "frightened to death".  A scared-white-as-a-ghost life #3 takes his place on the waiting bench; the cat recovers and finds Tweety amongst the moving targets in a shooting gallery. He climbs into the targets to get at his prey but is shot several times in rapid succession. With each shot (except the first two), lives 4 through 7 pop up on the bench. Sylvester bursts out of the gallery (narrowly missing another shot) and sees Tweety heading towards the roller coaster. As Tweety sits in the front seat proclaiming "That puddy tat will never find me here", the cat takes the seat directly behind him.  The train ascends the lift hill and proceeds to go through the drops and turns. Near the end of the ride on a straight track, Sylvester stands up. Just as he is about to pummel an unsuspecting Tweety with a club, he slams into the entranceway of a tunnel. Upon impact, the train carrying life #8 in the front seat runs through the tunnel and down Hell's twisted escalator conveyor belt route that took Sylvester's first life down earlier.

Ninth Life and Different Endings 
Recovering, Sylvester realizes that he only has one life left. The bulldog again goads him to go after Tweety, but Sylvester screams "No, no, no! I don't want him! I do-o-o-on't want him!" and runs off. In the CBS televised version of this feature, it fades to black, leaving the viewer to presume that Sylvester has sworn off Tweety for good.

In another rarely seen ending, stock footage of Pappy's Puppy is used. Sylvester is shown walking along the sidewalk and Butch J. Bulldog's son, attacks his tail. Sylvester puts him under a tomato can and Butch appears. He grabs Sylvester and frees his son, from  the can. Instead of showing Butch hammering the can over Sylvester, it fades to black; then shows Butch watching Sylvester walking by his doghouse. His son biting and pulling on his tale. The cartoon ends, with the impression Sylvester's purgatory is becoming the puppy's "playmate".

However, after the Looney Tunes Saturday morning franchise moved from CBS to ABC, the feature aired with the original ending:

After telling the bulldog he no longer wishes to pursue Tweety, he decides to secure his last life by moving into a bank vault with several cans of food, commenting that he will be safe in there and that nothing can happen to him. Later that night, two bank robbers (one named Mugsy) try to break into the safe using explosives, which Mugsy's cohort cautions him to not overdo it.  Moments later, the explosives detonate, sending the two robbers on their own descent on the escalator to Hell, with the other robber stating "You used too much [nitro], Mugsy!"  The disgruntled life #9, Sylvester's last life, standing behind them, adds: "Now he tells him!"

Home media 
This short was issued on the VHS Sylvester and Tweety's Tale Feathers. It is also available unedited and fully restored on Disc 1 of the Looney Tunes Golden Collection: Volume 6 DVD set and Disc 2 of the Looney Tunes Platinum Collection: Volume 3 Blu-ray set, with the latter restored to HD quality. It is also available on DVD on Looney Tunes Super Stars' Tweety & Sylvester: Feline Fwenzy.

References

External links 
 

1954 animated films
1954 short films
1950s Warner Bros. animated short films
Looney Tunes shorts
The Devil in film
Films set in hell
Short films directed by Friz Freleng
Films scored by Carl Stalling
1954 films
Animated films about cats
Animated films about dogs
Films set in amusement parks
Tweety films
Sylvester the Cat films
1950s English-language films